Ignacio Rodríguez Mazon (born 12 June 1996) is a Spanish field hockey player who plays as a defender for División de Honor side Club de Campo and the Spanish national team.

Club career
Rodríguez played for El Tenis in his birthplace Santander until 2017 when he joined Club de Campo in Madrid. After three seasons in Madrid, he returned to Tenis for the 2020–21 season. Having played one season in Santander he returned to Club de Campo.

International career
Rodríguez made his debut for the senior national team in January 2018 in a test match against Wales. He represented Spain at the 2018 World Cup. At the 2019 EuroHockey Championship, he won his first medal with the national team as they finished second.

References

External links

1996 births
Living people
Sportspeople from Santander, Spain
Spanish male field hockey players
Male field hockey defenders
2018 Men's Hockey World Cup players
Club de Campo Villa de Madrid players
División de Honor de Hockey Hierba players
2023 Men's FIH Hockey World Cup players